Lady Daddy is 2010 South Korean film about a transgender photographer who is discovered by her son.

Plot
Ji-hyeon (Lee Na-young) is a transgender woman working as a photographer. Then a young boy, Yoo-bin, shows up claiming Ji-hyeon is his divorced birth father. Ji-hyeon tries to juggle the role of father to Yoo-bin and girlfriend to her boyfriend played by Kim Ji-seok.

Cast
Lee Na-young as Ji-hyeon 
Kim Ji-seok as Jun-seok 
Jeong Ae-yeon as Bo-yeong (ex-wife of Ji-hyeon) 
Kim Hee-su as Yu-bin (Ji-hyeon & Bo-yeong's son) 
Lee Pil-mo as Min-kyu 
Kim Hee-won as Detective Kim 
Kim Pung as Baek-su
Jo Seung-eun as Sexy woman 
Kim Eung-soo as Ji-hyeon's father 
Domashchenko Vadym as Joseph 
Kim Jung-suk 
Jeong Gi-seop as Detective 1
 Tae In-ho as Men's suit salesman

References

External links
 
 
 

2010 films
2010 LGBT-related films
2010s Korean-language films
2010 comedy films
South Korean LGBT-related films
South Korean comedy films
Films about trans women
2010s South Korean films